Kanishka II (Brahmi:  Kā-ṇi-ṣka) was one of the emperors of the Kushan Empire from around 225–245 CE. He succeeded Vasudeva I who is considered to be the last great Kushan emperor.

Rule
While he upheld Kushan rule in northern India, it is likely that Kanishka II lost the western part of his empire, namely Bactria/Tokharistan to the Sasanian Shapur I (240-272 CE), whose conquests would be consolidated by the Kushano-Sassanians. In his inscriptions at Naqsh-e Rostam Shapur now claimed that he controlled the realm of the Kushans (Kūšān šahr) "up to Purushapura" (Peshawar), suggesting that he may have expanding even beyond the Hindu-Kush at the expense of the Kushans. The rock inscription at Rag-i-Bibi further support this view.

Several overstrikes by the Kushano-Sasanian Peroz I Kushanshah over coins of Kanishka II are known, and it is from the time of Peroz that the first Kushano-Sasanian coins were issued south of the Hindu-Kush.

Kanishka II may have retaken control of Gandhara at one point, as well as Kapiśa, and there are suggestions that following these successes he may have created a second Era of Kanishka in celebration of the hundredth anniversary of the original one.

Coinage and dated statuary

Notes

References

Sources

External links
 Online catalogue of coins of Kanishka II

Kushan emperors
3rd-century Indian monarchs